The IIHF World Junior Championship (WJC), or simply the "World Juniors" in ice hockey circles, is an annual event organized by the International Ice Hockey Federation (IIHF) for national under-20 ice hockey teams from around the world. It is traditionally held in late December, ending in early January. The tournament usually attracts the top hockey players in this age category. 

The main tournament features the top ten ranked hockey nations in the world, comprising the 'Top Division', from which a world champion is crowned. There are also three lower pools—Divisions I, II and III—that each play separate tournaments playing for the right to be promoted to a higher pool, or face relegation to a lower pool.

The competition's profile is particularly high in Canada, and this is partly for historical reasons in that prior to NHL players being allowed in the Winter Olympics, this was a rare tournament where the best western players faced the best players from the Soviet bloc, and the only other tournament of similar stature where this occurred was the irregularly scheduled Canada Cup invitational tournament. The tournament's stature in Canada can also be credited to Canada's strong performance in the tournament (it has won the gold medal twenty times since its inception), the role of hockey in Canadian culture, along with strong media coverage and fan attendance. As such, in recent years, nearly half of the tournaments have been held in Canadian cities, with the remainder being held in Europe and the United States.

Canada is the defending champion of the tournament, after defeating Czechia to win the 2023 edition in Halifax, Nova Scotia, Canada.

History
The first official tournament was held in 1977,  Although the first three tournaments from 1974 to 1976 were held unofficially. The tournament has been dominated by the teams from Canada and Soviet Union/CIS/Russia, together accounting for 31 of the 45 overall gold medals awarded (through 2021). The USSR won the first four official tournaments, while the Canadians put together five straight championships between 1993 and 1997, and another five straight from 2005 to 2009. Canada leads the all-time gold medal count with 20 golds, while the Soviet Union, the CIS and Russia combined have 13 golds.

When it began, the World Junior Championship was a relatively obscure tournament. It has since grown in prestige, particularly in Canada, where the tournament ranks as one of the most important events on the sports calendar and during the holiday season. The Globe and Mail writer Bruce Dowbiggin credits TSN, along with Canada's strong performance at the tournament, for turning it from an obscure non-event when it acquired the rights in 1991 (which had started to grow in prominence due to the 1987 Punch-up in Piestany) to one of Canada's most beloved annual sports events, and at the same time cementing the link between Canadian nationalism and hockey, and inspiring the NHL's Winter Classic.  Based on increasing attendances for countries repeatedly hosting the event, the popularity of the tournament seems to be growing in other nations as well.

At editions of the tournament held in the country, games involving Team Canada consistently sell out NHL arenas, offering large profit guarantees to Hockey Canada and the IIHF. In the 21st century, Canada has and will continue to host the tournament every second or third year due to the significantly greater following the tournament has in Canada compared to other participating countries.
Originally, Switzerland was selected to host the WJHC in 2010, but withdrew.
Buffalo, New York, in the United States, hosted the tournament in 2011 and 2018; in both cases, proximity to Canada's population core in Southern Ontario was a key factor in the city winning the bidding rights.

The tournament offers one of the most prestigious stages for young hockey players, significantly boosting a player's value for upcoming NHL Entry Drafts.

Punch-up in Piestany

One of the most infamous incidents in WJC history occurred in 1987 in Piestany, Czechoslovakia (now part of Slovakia), where a bench-clearing brawl occurred between Canada and the Soviet Union. It began when the Soviet Union's Pavel Kostichkin took a two-handed slash at Canadian player Theoren Fleury. The Soviet Union's Evgeny Davydov then came off the bench, eventually leading to both benches emptying. The officials, unable to break up the numerous fights, left the ice and eventually tried shutting off the arena lights, but the brawl lasted for 20 minutes before the IIHF declared the game null and void. A 35-minute emergency meeting was held, resulting in the delegates voting 7–1 (the sole dissenter was Canadian Dennis McDonald) to eject both teams from the tournament. The Canadian team chose to leave rather than stay for the end-of-tournament dinner, from which the Soviet team was banned.

While the Soviets were out of medal contention, Canada was playing for the gold medal and was leading 4–2 at the time of the brawl. The gold medal ultimately went to Finland, hosts Czechoslovakia took the silver and Sweden, who had previously been eliminated from medal contention, was awarded the bronze.

Medalists

Future tournaments
These tournaments have been announced:

Hockey Canada stated in January 2019 that Canada would also host the tournament in 2024, 2026, 2028, and 2031, though the 2022 and 2024 events have now been swapped between Canada and Sweden due to the COVID-19 pandemic.

Hosting countries

Note
1974, 1975 and 1976 unofficial tournaments are counted.
The 1975 and 1982 tournaments were co-hosted by the United States and Canada.
Including the 2023 tournament.

Participating countries
Canada, Finland and Sweden have participated in all 44 IIHF Ice Hockey World Junior Championships as well as the three unofficial World Junior Championships. USSR/CIS/Russia (when the Soviet Union broke up, Russia remained in Pool A, while all other former Soviet republics started competing in Pool C in 1993) and Czechoslovakia/Czech Republic have also participated in all official and unofficial World Junior Championships, and the United States has participated in all except the unofficial tournament in 1976.

When Czechoslovakia peacefully split in 1993, the Czech Republic remained in Pool A but Slovakia was placed in Pool C (now Division II). Slovakia was promoted to the top division for the 1996 Championships and has remained there since.

Starting with the 1996 tournament, the competition was increased from an 8-team round-robin to the current 10-team format, including elimination rounds. Since then, Switzerland has become a regular participant.

Germany has been a frequent participant in the top pool, having played there roughly half the time in the past decade. Latvia, Belarus, and Kazakhstan have also each made a number of top division appearances since the early 1990s.  Less frequent top pool appearances have been made by Austria, Denmark, France, Japan, Norway, Poland and Ukraine.

At the most recent championship, held in Canada in 2022, participating teams included Austria, Canada, the Czech Republic, Finland, Germany, Latvia, Slovakia, Sweden, Switzerland, and the United States.

Player eligibility 
A player is eligible to play in the World Junior Ice Hockey Championships if:
 the player is eligible to compete as a male athlete
 the player has his 20th birthday in the year of the tournament's ending (e.g. born in 1994 for 2014 tournament), and at latest, the fifth year after the tournament's ending (e.g. born in 1999 for 2014 tournament);
 the player is a citizen in the country he represents;
 the player is under the jurisdiction of a national association that is a member of the IIHF.

If a player who has never played in IIHF-organized competition wishes to switch national eligibility, he must have played in competitions for two consecutive years in the new country without playing in another country, as well as show his move to the new country's national association with an international transfer card. In case the player has previously played in IIHF-organized competition but wishes to switch national eligibility, he must have played in competitions for four consecutive years in the new country without playing in another country, he must show his move to the new country's national association with an international transfer card, as well as be a citizen of the new country. A player may only switch national eligibility once.

Tournament awards
At the conclusion of each tournament, the Directorate of the IIHF presents awards to the Top Goalie, Forward and Defenceman of the tournament. The media attending the event select an All-Star team separately from this.

Broadcast coverage 
The following television networks and websites broadcast World Junior Championship games on television or online.

TSN is the IIHF's main broadcast partner for this tournament. TSN.ca carries all games excluding relegation games live, as well as most games on demand after their completion.

Starting with the 2013 tournament, a paywall and geo-block was implemented on TSN's online coverage. The same system applies to Canadian cable subscribers and subscribers of TSN's streaming service - users cannot stream the tournament outside of Canada on TSN Direct.

Norway is currently a 'blackout' zone. Neither Eurosport or Viasat carry the tournament.

See also
Ice Hockey World Championships
IIHF World U18 Championship
IIHF World Ranking
World Junior A Challenge
World U-17 hockey challenge
2007 Super Series

Notes

General references

 Also .

Further reading

External links

IIHF World U20 all-time leading scorers at quanthockey.com
www.worldjuniors2008.com - 2008 IIHF World U20 Championship - Pardubice, Liberec, Czech republic
Result archive - Full results for men's, women's and junior championships since 1999 and medalists for all tournaments.
Complete archive of all IIHF tournaments in French at passionhockey.com.
World Juniors 2022 All Matches Time

International ice hockey competitions for junior teams
 
International Ice Hockey Federation tournaments
Junior ice hockey competitions
December sporting events
January sporting events
Recurring sporting events established in 1977
U20
Ice hockey events